Thawe or sometimes pronounced Thawen is a medium-sized village in Gopalganj district of Indian state of Bihar. This village is a popular pilgrimage site for Hindu believers of the surrounding areas as it hosts a notable Devi temple Thawe Mandir. Thawe is located about 6 kilometers south-west from the district headquarters Gopalganj.

Demographics
 the village has a total population of 643.

Transport

Rail
Thawe has a railway station, Thawe Junction, which comes under North Eastern Railways. This junction is about 71 km from Gorakhpur.
It comes between Gorakhpur - Kaptanganj - Padrauna - Siwan route.

Road
Thawe is located about 6 kilometers south-west from the district headquarters Gopalganj along National Highway 531 which connects this place to both Gopalganj and Chhapra and 70 km from Padrauna.

See also
 Thawe Mandir
 Gopalganj district, India

References

Villages in Gopalganj district, India